Hylton Gordon (born 5 October 1954) is a Jamaican cricketer. He played in twenty first-class and seven List A matches for the Jamaican cricket team from 1973 to 1980.

See also
 List of Jamaican representative cricketers

References

External links
 

1954 births
Living people
Jamaican cricketers
Jamaica cricketers
Sportspeople from Kingston, Jamaica